The 1892 United States presidential election in Delaware took place on November 8, 1892. All contemporary 44 states were part of the 1892 United States presidential election. State voters chose three electors to the Electoral College, which selected the president and vice president.

Delaware was won by the Democratic nominees, former President Grover Cleveland of New York and his running mate Adlai Stevenson I of Illinois.

Results

See also
 United States presidential elections in Delaware

References

Notes

Delaware
1892
1892 Delaware elections